Florfenicol (marketed by Schering-Plough Animal Health under the trade name Nuflor) is a fluorinated synthetic analog of thiamphenicol, mainly used in veterinary medicine.

As a generic, it is now available worldwide.

Indications 
In the United States, florfenicol is currently indicated for the treatment of bovine respiratory disease (BRD) associated with Mannheimia haemolytica, Pasteurella multocida, and Histophilus somni, for treatment of bovine interdigital phlegmon (foot rot, acute interdigital necrobacillosis, infectious pododermatitis) associated with Fusobacterium necrophorum and Bacteroides melaninogenicus.

Florfenicol is also used in aquaculture, and is licensed for use in the United States for the control of enteric septicemia in catfish.

Since the early 2000s, it is used in Europe, treating mainly primary or secondary colibacillosis in broiler and parent flocks. It is not allowed in laying hens, due to residues in eggs. It is also indicated in turkey.

The use of florfenicol in horses, and likely in other equids, typically causes diarrhea.  This has been anecdotally reported to progress to lethal cases of acute colitis. Therefore, use of this antimicrobial in the equine patient should be limited to cases in which other, safer, options are not available.

Contamination
Florfenicol was among the drug contaminants in a brand of supermarket eggs in Taiwan and Iran.

External links
Nuflor website

References

Amphenicols
Benzosulfones
Phenylethanolamines
Organofluorides
Acetamides
Organochlorides